Dreamland is an American drama film that was released on December 19, 2006. The primary plot focuses concern overcoming fear, struggling friend to friend relationships, and overall coming of age in small-town America.

Plot 
Eighteen-year-old Audrey (Agnes Bruckner) lives with her agoraphobic father (John Corbett) in a remote community in the breathtakingly beautiful New Mexico desert. Though Audrey longs to go to college, she spends her days taking care of her father, who hasn’t left home since Audrey’s mother died, and her best friend Calista (Kelli Garner), who dreams of becoming Miss America but is struggling with multiple sclerosis.

The summer after Audrey graduates from high school, her world is changed forever when an attractive young man named Mookie (Justin Long) moves in next door with his mother Mary (Gina Gershon) and her fiancé, Herb (Chris Mulkey). Knowing how much Calista longs for romance, Audrey encourages Mookie to ask Calista on a date. He obliges, and he and Calista soon become a couple. Audrey, however, finds herself developing feelings for Mookie, and as these feelings grow it becomes harder and harder for her to be the dependable, selfless person that her father and best friend have always counted on her to be.

Ultimately, Audrey, who has taken care of everyone around her, finally learns to take care of herself, and those whose lives she touched must find the strength to let her go.

References

External links
 
 

2006 films
2006 drama films
American drama films
Films scored by Anthony Marinelli
Films scored by Photek
2000s English-language films
2000s American films